In gas dynamics, Chaplygin's equation, named after Sergei Alekseevich Chaplygin (1902), is a partial differential equation useful in the study of transonic flow. It is

Here,  is the speed of sound, determined by the equation of state of the fluid and conservation of energy.

The Bernoulli equation (see the derivation below) states that maximum velocity occurs when specific enthalpy is at the smallest value possible; one can take the specific enthalpy to be zero corresponding to absolute zero temperature as the reference value, in which case  is the maximum attainable velocity. The particular integrals of above equation can be expressed in terms of hypergeometric functions.

Derivation
For two-dimensional potential flow, the continuity equation and the Euler equations (in fact, the compressible Bernoulli's equation due to irrotationality) in Cartesian coordinates  involving the variables fluid velocity , specific enthalpy  and density  are

with the equation of state  acting as third equation.

Since the flow is irrotational, a velocity potential  exists and its differential is simply . Similarly the velocity potential is replaced by a new function (Legendre transformation)

The continuity equation in the new coordinates become

For isentropic flow, where  is the speed of sound. Using the Bernoulli's equation we find

where . Hence, we have

See also
Euler–Tricomi equation

References

Partial differential equations
Fluid dynamics